The Best Male Athlete with a Disability ESPY Award is an annual award honoring the achievements of a male individual from the world of disabled sports. Established with the aid of disability advocate and former United States Paralympic soccer player Eli Wolff, the accolade's trophy, designed by sculptor Lawrence Nowlan, is presented to the disabled sportsman adjudged to be the best at the annual ESPY Awards ceremony in Los Angeles. The Best Male Athlete with a Disability ESPY Award was first bestowed as part of the ESPY Awards in 2005 after the non-gender specific Best Athlete with a Disability ESPY Award was presented the previous three years (all won by sportsmen). Balloting for the award is undertaken by fans over the Internet from between three and five choices selected by the ESPN Select Nominating Committee, which is composed of a panel of experts. It is conferred in July to reflect performance and achievement over the preceding twelve months.

The inaugural winner of the Best Male Athlete with a Disability ESPY Award in 2005 was Paralympic track and field competitor Marlon Shirley, who won two medals at the 2004 Summer Paralympics and was the first para-athlete to go below eleven seconds in the men's 100-meter category with a time of 10.97 seconds. In 2015, South African wheelchair racer Krige Schabort was selected as the recipient of the award. , he is the only athlete born outside of the United States to have won the accolade, though three additional foreign sportsmen have earned nominations. Track and field athletes have won more awards than any other sport with four with three triathlon winners and two winners each coming in sledge hockey, mixed martial arts,  and wrestling. It was not awarded in 2020 due to the COVID-19 pandemic. The most recent winner of the award was American para-swimmer Brad Snyder in 2022.

Winners and nominees

Statistics

See also
 Best Female Athlete with a Disability ESPY Award
 United States Olympic Committee Paralympian of the Year Award
 Laureus World Sports Award for Sportsperson of the Year with a Disability

References

External links
 

Awards established in 2005
Disabled sports awards
ESPY Awards